The Bayreuth Medical Center is the teaching hospital of the University of Erlangen-Nuremberg and is the largest hospital in Upper Franconia, Bavaria.

BMC was founded in 1938, and it is a maximum (tertiary) care hospital with 25 Clinics and Institutes and has the largest 24-hour Level I trauma Center in Upper Franconia.

With about 2300 employees and 294 training Vacancies The Bayreuth Medical Center is considered the largest employer in the Region.

Patient care
Bayreuth Medical Center is a 1086-bed and provides a comprehensive range of inpatient, clinical and diagnostic services in medical specialties and subspecialties.

Notes

References
 Klinikum Bayreuth website

External links
 University of Erlangen-Nuremberg
 BMC website
 University Hospital Erlangen website

Hospital buildings completed in 1938
Teaching hospitals in Germany
University of Erlangen-Nuremberg
Medical and health organisations based in Bavaria
Buildings and structures in Bayreuth